The United Nations Educational, Scientific and Cultural Organization (UNESCO) World Heritage Sites are places of importance to cultural or natural heritage as described in the UNESCO World Heritage Convention, established in 1972. Cultural heritage consists of monuments (such as architectural works, monumental sculptures, or inscriptions), groups of buildings, and sites (including archaeological sites). Natural features (consisting of physical and biological formations), geological and physiographical formations (including habitats of threatened species of animals and plants), and natural sites which are important from the point of view of science, conservation or natural beauty, are defined as natural heritage.  Malaysia ratified the convention on 7 December 1988.

Malaysia has four sites on the list.  The first two sites, Gunung Mulu National Park and Kinabalu Park, were listed in 2000. The site Historic Cities of the Straits of Malacca was listed in 2008, and the most recent one, the Archaeological Heritage of the Lenggong Valley, was listed in 2012. The two sites listed in 2000 are natural while the other two are cultural. In addition, there are six sites on the  tentative list. Malaysia  served as a member of the World Heritage Committee from 2011 to 2015.

World Heritage Sites 
UNESCO lists sites under ten criteria; each entry must meet at least one of the criteria. Criteria i through vi are cultural, and vii through x are natural.

Tentative list
In addition to sites inscribed on the World Heritage List, member states can maintain a list of tentative sites that they may consider for nomination. Nominations for the World Heritage List are only accepted if the site was previously listed on the tentative list. Malaysia lists six properties on its tentative list.

See also
 Tourism in Malaysia

References

 
Malaysia
Malaysia geography-related lists
Lists of tourist attractions in Malaysia
World Heritage Sites